"Skew It on the Bar-B" is the lead single released from OutKast's third studio album, Aquemini. The song features Raekwon. It failed to chart on the Billboard Hot 100. The song features verses from André 3000, Raekwon, and Big Boi, respectively. Organized Noize produced the song.

Raekwon's verse was ranked 13 on Complex's "Top 50 Best verses of All Time"

Formats and track listings
 12" Vinyl Single
 "Skew It on the Bar-B" (Album Version) – 3:07
 "Skew It on the Bar-B" (Instrumental) – 3:27
 "Skew It on the Bar-B" (Radio Version – Feat. Raekwon) – 3:15
 "Skew It on the Bar-B" (Acapella – Feat. Raekwon) – 3:20

References

1998 singles
Outkast songs
Songs written by André 3000
Songs written by Big Boi
1998 songs
LaFace Records singles
Arista Records singles
Songs written by Raekwon